Áed Ua Crimthainn (fl. 12th century), also called Áed mac Crimthainn, was abbot and coarb of Terryglass, near Lough Derg in County Tipperary, Ireland. He was the principal scribe of the Book of Leinster, the Book of Oughaval, an important Middle Irish medieval illuminated manuscript, and is also believed to have been its sole compiler.

Áed signed himself .

Life and work
Áed was a scholar and a descendant of an old ecclesiastical family of County Laois who were the comarbai (heirs) of Colum moccu Loigse, the 6th century founder of the religious house of Terryglass and a friend of Colum Cille. He was the temporal, if not the spiritual, head of Terryglass, succeeding Finn mac maic Chélechair Ui Cheinnéidig, who died in 1152. It seems that Áed himself had no successor and was the last coarb, as Terryglass was burned down in 1164 and was then dissolved by reforms later in the century.

Áed was a friend of Finn mac Gussáin Ua Gormáin, bishop of Kildare and abbot of Newry, who sometimes collaborated with him. Both Finn and Gilla na Náem Úa Duinn assisted Áed with compiling the Book of Leinster.

According to a note in the Book of Leinster "Áed Ua Crimthainn wrote the book and collected it from many books". It is a literary compendium of stories, poetry, and history, and it appears from annals included in it that it was written between 1151 and 1201, although largely completed by the 1160s. The last entry in the manuscript in Áed's hand which can be dated appears to belong to the year 1166. Gerald of Wales saw the book when he accompanied his cousin Strongbow on his invasion of Ireland and said of its illuminations that they were "the work of Angels".

Áed was probably the court historian of Diarmait Mac Murchada. This described Diarmait's ambitions and the achievements of his great-grandfather Diarmait mac Maíl na mBó. Áed's description of the period between the death of Máel Sechnaill mac Domnaill and the rise of Diarmait mac Maíl na mBó was misread by Conall Macgeoghegan when he compiled the so-called Annals of Clonmacnoise in the 17th century, leading to the inclusion of poet Cuán Ua Lothcháin and abbot Corcrán Clérech in some old lists of High Kings of Ireland.

A letter from Bishop Finn to Áed was copied into the Book of Leinster, at folio 206, by one of the other hands of the manuscript. This has been called the oldest surviving personal letter to have been written in Ireland, although this ignores earlier correspondence between Irish bishops and the archbishops of Canterbury. The letter reads:

Áed respected Irish tradition, even when it offended his religious beliefs or his educated sense of reason. However, at the end of the Book of Leinster, the writer added this reservation:

Notes

12th-century Irish abbots
12th-century Irish historians
Medieval European scribes
Irish scribes
12th-century Irish poets
People from County Laois
People from County Tipperary
Irish male poets
Irish-language writers